Flora Alakbar gyzy Karimova (born July 23, 1941) is a famous Azerbaijani pop, mugam and opera singer, actress, People's Artist of the Republic of Azerbaijan (1992), activist of the National Freedom Movement, prominent public figure. Ambassador of Peace of the World Peace Federation to the UN, Vice President of the World Azerbaijanis Cultural Center Public Union (DAMMIB), Chairwoman of the DAMMIB Women's Council, Honorary Member of the Public Oversight Coalition, Chairwoman of the Committee of Martyrs' Mothers (2018), currently Vice President, Honorary Citizen of Khojaly, Honorary member of the Turkish World Writers and Artists Foundation.

Early life 
Flora Karimova was born in Baku on July 23, 1941. By her own accord, she was an unwanted child; her mother had attempted to terminate the pregnancy, which was not possible at the time due to the anti-abortion laws in the Soviet Union.

Career

Early career 

In 1965, Karimova was admitted to the Narimanov Medical Institute majoring in medical business and graduated in 1971. From 1972 to 1977, she studied at the Azerbaijan State Conservatory specializing in vocal arts, where she strengthened her voice to four octaves. During this period, she became a popular Azerbaijan Soviet pop singer. At the time, she mostly sang Soviet style Pop and Classic style songs, between 1955 and 1967. After 1967, Karimova began singing national orchestra based rock and Jazz style songs, becoming the first person to do so in the field. Her unique voice appealed to audiences around the country.

Karimova pioneered Azerbaijan Soviet Music History by being the first to sing rock and roll. She had a duet with the Soviet pop singer, Gulagha Mammadov (Gülağa Məmmədov). Karimova sang some of the most popular songs first time at the concert, such as Reyhan, Telebe, Okhu Tar, Gejeler Bulak Bashi, Dalghalar, Qurban adina, Men seni araram, Gulerem Gulsen, Geceler, Geceler bulaq bashi, Azerbaycanim, Maralim Gel, Lirik Mahni, Sen menimsen men senin, Sachlarina Gul duzum, Sevirem Seni, Sevmeyir qoy sevmesin, Bakinin isihiqlari, Baki geceleri, Gelmedi yar, Getme-getme, Uzaq yashil ada, Bele qemli dayanma, Kepenek and so on. She also sang the soundtracks for most theater, films, and cartoons. Her famous soundtracks were Qaynana, Alma Almaya Benzer, Baki sabahin xeyir, Gece yaman uzundur, Ey heyat sen ne qeribesen, Onun Belali sevgisi, Evleri Kondelen yar, as well as cartoon soundtracks are Tiq Tiq xanim (Pis pisa xanim) ve Sichan bey, Humayin yuxusu, Toplan among others.

1960s musical history 

Although Karimova began her professional music career in 1954, by singing Indian's marvels series music, (composed by Shafiga Akhundova) she became popular in the 1960s. In the early 1960s, Karimova started her career by singing Fikrat Amirov's songs. She also performed in the ensemble choir of Medical University. After 1962, she was invited for the second time to sing in a film, "Boyuk Dayaq." Karimova sang "Perishanin mahnisi" composed by Fikrat Amirov. Subsequently, she continued to cover professional songs by popular composers, including, Fikrat Amirov (Sevil Operasi), Seid Rustamov, Rauf Hajiyev, Tofig Bakikhanov, Aghabajy Rzayeva, Tofiq Ahmedov, Alakbar Taghiyev, Tamilla Mammadzade, Shafiqa Axundova, Ramiz Mustafayev, Suleyman Asgerov, Safar Sheykhov, Tofig Guliyev, Ramiz Mustafayev, and her first husband, Prof. Doctor Ibrahim Topchubashov (İbrahim Topçubaşov). The next significant proposal was made by Bahram Mansurov, who persuaded Karimova to perform the Leyla role on "Leyla and Majnun Opera" in Opera and Ballet Theater. Although Flora khanum rejected at first, Mr. Mansurov insisted her to play the role, preparing her himself. In 1966, she appeared on the stage of Opera and Ballet whose proponent was Arif Babayev. Arif Babayev started his professional career playing Majnun sharing stage with Karimova at that time. This drew millions of audience to watch first ever history in Leyla & Majnun with great passion and excitement, enjoying Opera in Flora Karimova's 4 octave voice. This event became one of the most successful performances for "Leyla and Majnun Opera." Upon realizing her Pop-rock vocal voice was tuning out in favor of national mugham style, she stopped altogether and left the theater for good after 8 times of performing "Leyla and Majnun."

Performing "Leyla and Majnun" launched her into fame and popularity. Her reputation dramatically increased and drew more attention and adoration. Flora Karimova had a unique and cute laugh adored by millions of her followers and poets were devoted to her kind and lively laugh. Tofig Guliyev composed "Sən mənimsən mən sənin" (You are mine and İ am yours) for her and asked her to sing it.

In 1967, she was invited to take a part in the film of "Qanunnamine." Director Ehsen Dadashov deluded her as she remembers: "I was firstly promised to play a role of Balash, who was a second part minor character in the film. But in fact, they had been preparing me for the main role of Zulyekha. After all in a sudden, I was told that I had been opted for a main role, and there was actually no way I could reject it." In "Qanunnamine" she showed her crafty and sophisticated artistic skills and represented her character with high approval modelling. However, after this successful performance, she was invited to star in other film that she had to turn down because of her husband's death (Ibrahim Topchubashov)

Flora khanym sang various genres of music. In her early repertoire started Azerbaijan Turkic National style of Folk songs those were composed by Alakbar Taghiyev.
She is the first singer who sang together with famous Azerbaijan singer Gulagha Mammadov. They had several songs such as Tiblisi, Shirin Arzular. In this sequence she sang most famous songs which were very well-known and popular at time. She is a pioneering singer with her firsts. She sang first time of most popular songs like Seid Rustamov's "Oxu Tar". As a pop singer, she sang several songs for films. She officially debuted in October 1960, on the stage of the Azerbaijan State Philharmonic Hall. Her repertoire includes lyrical compositions, but she has also performed rhythmical compositions. Her beauty and charm with her splendid voice appealed to everyone all over Soviet countries. She frequently gave concerts, mostly in Moscow where the audience regularly gave her standing ovation.

By the mid-1960s, she started to sing rock and jazz style songs. In 1967, she sang 23 jazz songs which brought her solid popularity. In the first half of 1960, Karimova sang two new songs by pop composers Emin Sabitglu and Oktay Kazimi. In fact both those composers started their professional career with Karimova.

Popular songs 

in 1965 and 1969 most of popular songs performed by Flora Karimova which surged her fame and played significantly improve her reputation. Her some songs especially Sachlarina Gul Duzum (R.Hajiyev), Ozumden Kuserem (E.Sabitoglu), Baghishla meni (T.Bakixanov), Axtarma Meni (E.Sabitoglu), Ne Bextiyardiq (I.Topchubashov), Ey Heyat Sen ne Qeribesen (O.Kazimi), Yansin Gerek (O.Kazimi), Perishanin Mahnisi (F.Amirov), Azerbaycanim (R.Hajiyev), Bakinin Ishiqlari (I.Karimov), Bir xeber ver ey kulek (T.Mammadzadeh), Chinar ve Men (O.Kazimi), Dalgalar (R.Mirishli), Ele xoshbaxtam ki (R.Mustafayev), Elvida Hindistan (S.Akhundova), Gece Yaman Uzundur (F.Babayeva), Gelmedin (S.Rustamov), Getme yar (S.Rustamov), Gozellikler Meskeni (T.Bakikhanov), Gozum dushdu (H. Khanmammadov), Gule vererdim (R.Mustafayev), Hamidan Goyechek (I.Topchubashov), Intizar (N.Mammadov), Konlum (R.Mustafayev), Kusmerem (S.Asgerov), Layla (Seid Rustamov), Lay-Lay (Hokume Najafova), Maralim gel (S.Rustamov), Neylerem Unutsan (E. Taghiyev), Qurban oldugum (T.Bakikhanov), Telebe (T.Hajiyev), Reyhan (F.Amirov), Ay gozel, Baki (J.Jahangirov), Sen menimsen men senin (T.Guliyev), Sene men neyledim (O.Kazimi), Sensiz olmasin (T.Mammadzade), Sensizlik (J.Jahangirov), Sevgilim (S.Rustamov),

Sevirem Seni (S.Rustamov), Sevmeyir qoy sevmesin (S.Rustamov), Shirin Arzular (E.Taghiyev), Ulduzlar (H.Najafova) and so on were in her beloved repertoire.

In 1967, she became the first Azerbaijan Soviet woman driver, driving her first Jiquli car. She appeared in her car frequently in musical sketches.

1970s musical history 

In 1971 she returned to stage and sing only pop songs of famous compositors as well as for more films and cartoons. in the 1970s she became a Modern Model of Icon for new Soviet generation. Everyone who considered to be modern and European kind as well as elite or upper side of society with high intelligence and culture preferred to listen to Flora Karimova. She was regarded as a kind of an especial image for those who treated stood out from common social conception rather than Contemporary Rebellions in culture and manner. At these years She was singing song what was rearranged by Popular jazzman Vagif Mustafazadeh. The famous Azerbaijan kid song "Tiq Tiq xanim" is one of their work. Sadly, these two amazing creative and talented art founders were not allowed to work together later.

Since 1971 she sang popular songs composed by famous composers such as Oktay Kazimi, Emin Sabitoghlu, Elza Ibrahimova, Nariman Mammadov, Taleh Hajiyev, Sevda Ibrahimova Firengiz Babayeva, Eldar Mansurov, Israil Karimov, Cahangir Cahangirov, Tofiq Babayev, Mobil Babayev, Cavanshir Quliyev, Oqtay Rajabov, Ramiz Mirishli, Faiq Sujaddinov, Ruhangiz Qasimova, Vasif Adigozelov, Siyavush Karimi, Khayyam Mirzazade, Tofig Ahmedov, Arif Malikov whose careers started by performing their firsts by Flora Karimova.

In 1975 Flora Karimova was prevented from public for different reasons due to her singing style and opinions. Karimova used to sing her songs in genre of rock. At that time rock song is strictly disapproved by Soviet so what she song to become banned while those songs were performed by different singer in jazz or classic pop genres, most famous song of Gel Qaytar Eshqimi is as an example. This song virtually composed for Flora khanum by Oktay Kazimi. She sang it in Moscow accompanied by outstanding Soviet conductor Yuriy Silentev (Юрий Силантьев) and his orchestra. in the 1970s She sang famous sequence songs with his orchestra; Qocalir anam, Bele ola hemishe, Yaghma Yaghis, Niye gelmedin and others.

She became famous. The Azerbaijan Soviet Authority Governess offered her a position in the KGB as a part of a honey trap operation, eliminating anti-Soviet businessmen and public figures. Karimova rejected this offer. Now endangered, she defected to Poland. She frequently was invited back to Baku to perform in musical and theatrical shows.

1980s 

In 1983 she left Azerbaijan for Poland till 1987. When she returned she resumed her career and just in 1987 she sang 56 songs, 25 concerts, 23 songs for theater plays, 9 songs for films, and 1 for a cartoon. Sadly 1988 Her husband died in a car accident. Flora Karimova said she enjoyed working with the late composer Emin Sabitoglu, who composed a number of lyrical songs for her.

Besides the songs by Emin Sabitoglu, Flora Karimova's repertoire includes songs by Ramiz Mirishli, Tofig Guliyev, Aygun Samadzadeh, Kamal, Khanim Ismayilgizi and many other composers. In 1983, Flora Karimova became the soloist of Azerbaijan State Television. She has recorded and released more than twenty solo albums. Besides the songs by Emin Sabitoglu, Flora Karimova's repertoire includes songs by Ramiz Mirishli, Tofig Guliyev, Aygun Samadzadeh, Kamal, Khanim Ismayilgizi and many other composers. In 1983, Flora Karimova became the soloist of Azerbaijan State Television.

Social and political activities 

In 1988 in Karabakh a big area of forest named Topkhana was cut down by Armenians. It caused to rise a tension in Baku and thousands of people protested against it. Later this problem turned a War when Armenians demanded illegally Karabakh to include as a part of Armenia.
Flora Karimova joined the rally of defence of the rights of Azerbaijan which later turned a political campaign of National Independence Movement and became one of civil right activist and renounced public figure. She was entitled to Lady (Khanym) due to her gallantry, honesty and honorable public affairs.

In 1988 her records began to be terminated and almost half of her archive was undermined by Soviet Authority to punish and deter her from her political movement. Nothing prevented her from her combat. Flora Karimova was first ever Azerbaijan modern woman social freedom and human rights activist. Her great valour was when Soviet Army attacked Azerbaijan killing millions of civilian in January 19 night. Next day Flora Karimova rebelled against Soviet Authority marching with women in streets among tanks. Whereupon one of tank near Philarmonic Hall drove toward flock of people. Upon realising tank at speed coming everyone rushed out of scene except Flora Khanum who interrupted the Russian's tanks to enter second time to city to shed blood 1990, January 21 as she stood still in front of tanks and stretching her arms. Tank stopped straight very close to her and did not move forward.

She played a significant role in the way of regaining Independence in Azerbaijan of Russia second time and establishing Modern Republic State. She served boldly for Freedom of Azerbaijan and the genuine right of Karabakh. She was one close fighter friend of Azerbaijan Independence Leader Abulfaz Elchibey (Əbülfəz Elçibəy). Since 1995 Flora Karimova disagreed Heydar Aliyev's government and began to struggle for human rights and democracy in Azerbaijan. She had organised and initiated considerably important campaigns for Democratic values and human rights in Baku and became one successful public figure in her struggling period.

Since 1995 she was banned to public and on TV channels and radios. Her songs in films, theater plays and cartoons were removed or skewed intentionally to vanish her music history for good for second time. During this horror period it can be estimated her more than two-thirds of her musical archive was wiped off. Flora Karimova did not stop her opposition movement for the sake of reforming democracy. Government slandered and abused her by blaming her in immortality and selling out the country. False accusation and conspiracy could not defame her greatness. Despite of deliberate vilification for more than two decades neither any of those malign misrepresenting frightened her nor dishonoured her reputation.

In 2005 she was nominated as a unanimous candidate of APFP, Musavat and other major political parties unions for parliamentary elections. Although she won the election, her result was distorted for her opponent Hijran Huseynova, She completely disagreed and sued Azerbaijan government to court. in 2015 However She won European Court, her rights were not compensated. After last ever Great Orange Freedom Rebelling Campaign she faced a life threat and witnessed more ever terrible evils. Since 2006 she gave up her social and political actions and in 2007 she was pardoned and permitted lifting her forbids as on TV and Radio.

Flora Karimova was allowed to some TV and radios since February 1, 2018. This initiative was implemented by those TV and radio organisation's directors.

Alongside popular Azerbaijan stylist Anar Aghakishiev made up her face by resembling her of 40 years old one. This event took an immense resonance and caused a big platform of discussion on social media.

Honors 
In 1992, Flora Karimova was awarded the title of the People's Artist of Azerbaijan. Flora Karimova thus became the first singer in the history of independent Azerbaijan to be awarded this title.

Filmography

Soundtracks 

 Böyük dayaq (film, 1962)
O qızı tapın (film, 1970)
 Gün keçdi (film, 1971)
 Qız, oğlan və şir (film, 1974)
 Şahzadə-qara qızıl (film, 1974)
 Alma almaya bənzər (film, 1975) (tammetrajlı bədii film)
 Şir evdən getdi (film, 1977)
 Toplan və kölgəsi (film, 1977)
 Qayınana (film, 1978)
 Sonrakı peşmançılıq (film, 1978)
 Onun bəlalı sevgisi (film, 1980)
 Evləri köndələn yar (film, 1982)
 Əzablı yollar (film, 1982)
 Bağışla (film, 1983)
 Humayın yuxusu (film, 1985)
 Səndən xəbərsiz (film, 1985)
 Xüsusi vəziyyət (film, 1986)
 Sən həmişə mənimləsən (film, 1987)
 Ağ atlı oğlan (film, 1995) (tammetrajlı bədii film)
 Ünvansız eşq (film, 2012)
 Balta Azərbaycan filmi (2015)

As actress (selected) 

Starring role
 Qanun naminə (film, 1968)
 Həyat bizi sınayır (film, 1972)
 Yollar görüşəndə... (film, 1979)

Supporting role
 Abşeron ritmləri (film, 1970) (tammetrajlı musiqili-bədii film)
 Toyda görüş (film, 1970)
 Konsert proqramı (film, 1971) (I)
 Mahnı qanadlarında (film, 1973) (tammetrajlı musiqili-bədii televiziya filmi)
 Payız melodiyaları (film, 1974)
 Nəğməkar torpaq (film, 1981)

 Other
(Arxiv kadrlarda səsindən istifadə olunan filmlər)
 Göylər sonsuz bir dənizdir. II film. Züleyxa (film, 1995)
 Sonun başlanğıcı (film, 2012)
 Ləkə (teleserial, 2013)

References

20th-century Azerbaijani women singers
Azerbaijani women pop singers
Musicians from Baku
1941 births
Living people
People's Artists of Azerbaijan
Soviet Azerbaijani people